Para-Badminton debuted at the 2020 Summer Paralympics held in Tokyo, Japan.

Para-Badminton is a variant of the badminton for athletes with a variety of physical disabilities. The sport is governed by the Badminton World Federation (BWF) since 2011.

Summary

History 
The 2020 Summer Olympics makes the debut appearance of badminton, with 14 events hold.

Events

Medal table

Successful national teams
Below is the gold medalists showed based on category and countries after the 2020 Summer Olympics. Bolded numbers below indicate a country as the overall winner of Olympic badminton of that year.

Medal summary by event

Men's singles

Men's singles WH1

Men's singles WH2

Men's singles SL3

Men's singles SL4

Men's singles SU5

Men's singles SH6

Women's singles

Women's singles WH1

Women's singles WH2

Women's singles SL4

Women's singles SU5

Men's doubles

Men's doubles WH1–WH2

Women's doubles

Women's doubles WH1–WH2

Women's doubles SL3–SU5

Mixed doubles

Mixed doubles SL3–SU5

Competition
Paralympics badminton consists of a group stage and single-elimination tournament.  Each match is played to the best of three games.  Games are up to 21 points.  Rally scoring is used, meaning a player does not need to be serving to score.  A player must win by two points or be the first player to 30 points.

Participating nations 
The following nations have taken part in the badminton competition. The numbers in the table indicate the number of competitors sent to that year's Paralympics.

See also 
 Badminton at the Summer Olympics
 Badminton at the 2020 Summer Paralympics

References

 
Paralympics
Sports at the Summer Paralympics
Para-badminton